R. William Hasker (born 1935) is an American philosopher and Distinguished Professor Emeritus of Philosophy at Huntington University. For many years he was editor of the prestigious journal Faith and Philosophy. He has published many journal articles and books dealing with issues such as the mind–body problem, theodicy, and divine omniscience. He has argued for "open theism" and a view known as "emergentism" regarding the nature of the human person. Hasker regards the soul as an "emergent" substance, dependent upon the body for its existence.

Hasker received his PhD in theology and philosophy of religion from the University of Edinburgh. His 1999 publication The Emergent Self discusses the philosophy of mind and attempts to establish that mind cannot be solely a material process but is also not completely distinct from its physical basis in the brain.

Selected publications
Hasker has published numerous works. A selection:
 1983, Metaphysics: Constructing a World View (InterVarsity Press)
 1989, God, Time, and Knowledge
 1999, The Emergent Self (Cornell University Press)
 2004, Providence, Evil, and the Openness of God
 2008, The Triumph of God over Evil: Theodicy for a World of Suffering (IVP Academic)
 2013, Metaphysics and the Tri-Personal God. Oxford Studies in Analytic Theology. (Oxford University Press)

References 

1935 births
Alumni of the University of Edinburgh
American philosophers
American theologians
Living people